Abdul Razak Dawood, is a Pakistani industrialist and was the Adviser for Commerce and Investment to the ex-Prime Minister Imran Khan. He served as a former Federal Minister of Commerce, Industries & Production between 1999 and 2002 in the cabinet of Pervez Musharraf.

He is founder of Descon and an engaged member of the Lahore Chamber of Commerce and Industry.

He had been also a member of the Imran Khan Cabinet as Advisor to PM for Commerce, Investment, Industries & Production and Textile.

Early life and education 
After initial schooling in the UK Dawood studied and graduated in Mining Engineering from the Newcastle University. In 1968 he obtained his Master degree in Business Administration (MBA) from the Columbia University.

He is a nephew of the late Seth Ahmed Dawood (1905–2002) who was considered one of the pioneering industrialists of Pakistan.

Career
He started his career in the family business at Lawrencepur Woolen and Textile Mills in 1968 and was then transferred to Dawood Hercules Chemical Limited to become the Managing Director from 1973 till 1981.

In 1977 Dawood founded Descon Engineering (Pvt.) Limited. After his father and the siblings decided by the late 1970s and early 80s to part ways, he has been associated with it since 1981 till 2018 in the capacity of Managing Director (CEO) and as the Chairman. Under his leadership Descon developed to perhaps the first Pakistani multinational company in Engineering, Construction, Chemicals, and the Power business. It is operating with four overseas manufacturing units and over 30.000 employees. Descon’s employees include over 30 nationalities working in the GCC, (including United Arab Emirates, Saudi Arabia, Oman, Qatar, Kuwait), Iraq, Pakistan, in South Africa and Kenya.

Dawood is also a former:
 Director of the State Bank of Pakistan.
 Chairman of Rousch (Pakistan) Power Limited
 Chairman of the Pakistan Business Council, a business driven forum on economic policies.

Social engagement
Razak Dawood has been deeply involved in education for many years, beginning when he became a visiting faculty member in 1975 till 1981 at the newly established MBA Programme at the University of Punjab. In the early 1980s he became one of the founders of the Lahore University of Management Sciences (LUMS) and has been the rector of the University from its inception. Currently he is a member of the board of trustees of the University.

He was a former trustee for the first ten years of the Shaukat Khanum Memorial Hospital.

The Bilquis and Abdul Razak Dawood (BARD) Foundation in Lahore is a venture undertaken Dawood and his wife to enable less fortunate individuals’ to realize their potential.

References

Living people
Commerce Ministers of Pakistan
Pakistani industrialists
Pakistani chief executives
Columbia Business School alumni
A
Pakistani company founders
Year of birth missing (living people)
Pakistani people of Gujarati descent
Memon people
Pakistani mining engineers